Lea Pearson (1942 - 1995) was an educational psychologist who played an important role in developing training in educational psychology in Britain.

Life
Lea Pearson graduated in psychology from the University of Hull followed by teacher training. After teaching in Birmingham, she moved to Manchester where she completed the training in educational psychology. She worked as an educational psychologist in Lancashire before becoming Principal Educational Psychologist for the City of Birmingham in 1980. She was awarded a special professorship of Applied Psychology by the University of Nottingham. 
 
She was active in the British Psychological Society, of which she was elected president in 2008. She was only the second educational psychologist to hold this position.

Publications
 Pearson, L. (1988). Conductive education. The Psychologist.
 Pearson, L., & Tweddle, D. (1984). The formulation and use of behavioural objectives. In D. Fontana (ed) Behaviourism and learning theory in education. Edinburgh: Scottish Academic Press.

Awards
 1987 - 1988 - President, British Psychological Society

References

1942 births
1995 deaths
British psychologists
Presidents of the British Psychological Society
20th-century psychologists